Hormurus longimanus is a species of scorpion in the Hormuridae family. It is native to Australia, where it occurs in the tropical Top End of the Northern Territory. It was first described in 1995.

Distribution and habitat
The species is restricted to dry monsoon forests along the western edge of the deeply dissected escarpment of the Arnhem Land plateau, where aquifers fed by wet season orographic rainfall maintain permanent pools through the dry season.

References

 

 
longimanus
Scorpions of Australia
Endemic fauna of Australia
Fauna of the Northern Territory
Animals described in 1995